A non-exhaustive list of the tallest completed structures in the Netherlands. The list contains all types of structures.

References

External links 
 
 

Netherlands
Tallest